The Mainzer Namentagung is a series of linguistics conferences with a focus on all areas of onomastics held annually at University of Mainz. So far, 7 editions of the conference have been carried out.

See also
 List of linguistics conferences

References

Linguistics conferences